Andy Roddick defeated Juan Carlos Ferrero in the final, 6–3, 6–4 to win the men's singles tennis title at the 2006 Cincinnati Masters.

Roger Federer was the defending champion, but lost in the second round to Andy Murray. It would be Federer's only defeat prior to a tournament final that season.

Seeds

Draw

Finals

Top half

Section 1

Section 2

Bottom half

Section 3

Section 4

References
 2006 Western & Southern Financial Group Masters Draw
 2006 Western & Southern Financial Group Masters Qualifying Draw

Singles